Humppakalmisto (Humppa Cemetery) is a 2013 album by the Finnish band Eläkeläiset. It consists of humppa covers of folk and traditional songs.

The album also has a bonus track called Humppatuuri (Humppa luck).

2013 albums